Centerview is an unincorporated community in Edwards County, Kansas, United States.

History
A post office was opened in Centerview in 1917, and remained in operation until it was discontinued in 1959.

References

Further reading

External links
 Edwards County maps: Current, Historic, KDOT

Unincorporated communities in Edwards County, Kansas
Unincorporated communities in Kansas